Sohanlal.P.S  (born 18 December 1978), better known by his screen name Sohan Seenulal, is an Indian film director, screen writer, and actor who works in Malayalam cinema . He is known for his character roles in Mammootty films.

Career 
He started his career as a child artist in Kabuliwala(1994) directed by Siddique-Lal. Later he joined as assistant directors to Shafi in starting from One Man Show (2001). And he continued his career as an assistant director till 2008. In 2008 he was an assistant director on Prithviraj Sukumaran's Lollipop (film).

In 2011, Seenulal debuted as a director with the film Doubles, which starred Mammootty. In 2016, he directed Vanyam with Aparna Nair in lead. His upcoming directorial is Unlocked, starring Chemban Vinod Jose, Mamtha Mohandas and Sreenath Bhasi lead roles.

Sohan Seenulal debuted in acting with a police role as Madhu in Nivin Pauly's,  Action Hero Biju directed by Abrid Shine.
Sohan Seenulal's short film “Cupid” got best second short film award in indiavision short film fest . Sohan got best screen writer award in this short film at this first ala short film festival. And his film Vanyam got best director award in shanthadevi puraskaram Kozhikode.

Filmography

References

External links 

Living people
Artists from Kochi
Malayalam film directors
Film directors from Kerala
1978 births